Dame Mary Rosa Alleyne Hunnings  (born 24 March 1935), known professionally as Mary Berry, is an English food writer, chef, baker and television presenter. After being encouraged in domestic science classes at school, she studied catering at college. She then moved to France at the age of 22 to study at Le Cordon Bleu culinary school, before working in a number of cooking-related jobs.

She has published more than 75 cookery books, including her best-selling Baking Bible in 2009. Her first book was The Hamlyn All Colour Cookbook in 1970. She hosted several television series for the BBC and Thames Television. Berry is an occasional contributor to Woman's Hour and Saturday Kitchen. She is a judge on the television programme The Great British Bake Off.

Early life
Berry was born on 24 March 1935, the second of three children, to Margaret (‘Marjorie’, née Wilson; 1905–2011) and Alleyne William Steward Berry (1904–1989). Alleyne was a surveyor and planner who served as Mayor of Bath in 1952 and was closely involved in establishing the University of Bath at Claverton Down. Mary's great-great-grandfather on her father's side, Robert Houghton, was a master baker in the 1860s who provided bread for a local workhouse in Norwich. Her mother died in 2011 aged 105.

At the age of 13, Berry contracted polio and had to spend three months in hospital. This resulted in her having a twisted spine, a weaker left hand and thinner left arm. She has said that the period of forced separation from her family while in the hospital "toughened [her] up" and taught her to make the most of every opportunity she would have.

Berry attended Bath High School, where she described her academic abilities as "hopeless" until she attended domestic science classes with a teacher called Miss Date, who was particularly encouraging of her cooking abilities. Her first creation in the class was a treacle sponge pudding which she took home, and her father told her that it was as good as her mother's.

She then studied catering at Bath College of Domestic Science.

Career
Berry's first job was at the Bath Electricity Board showroom and then conducting home visits to show new customers how to use their electric ovens. She would typically demonstrate the ovens by making a Victoria sponge, a technique she would later repeat when in television studios to test out an oven she had not used before. Her catchment area for demonstrations was limited to the greater Bath area, which she drove around in a Ford Popular supplied as a company car.

Her ambition was to move out of the family home to London, which her parents would not allow until she was 21. At the age of 22, she applied to work at the Dutch Dairy Bureau, while taking City & Guilds courses in the evenings. She then persuaded her manager to pay for her to undertake the professional qualification from the French Le Cordon Bleu school.

She left the Dutch Dairy Bureau to become a recipe tester for PR firm Benson's, where she began to write her first book. She has since cooked for a range of food-related bodies, including the Egg Council and the Flour Advisory Board. In 1966 she became food editor of Housewife magazine. She was food editor of Ideal Home magazine from 1970 to 1973.

Her first cookbook, The Hamlyn All Colour Cookbook, was published in 1970. She launched her own product range in 1994 with her daughter Annabel. The salad dressings and sauces were originally only sold at Mary's AGA cooking school, but have since been sold in Britain, Germany and Ireland with retailers such as Harrods, Fortnum & Mason and Tesco.

She has also appeared on a BBC Two series called The Great British Food Revival, and her solo show, Mary Berry Cooks, began airing on 3 March 2014.

In December 2012, Berry became the first president of the new Bath Spa University Alumni Association.

In her own kitchen, she uses a KitchenAid mixer which she describes as being the one gadget she could not live without. She has always had an AGA cooker, and used to run cooking courses for AGA users. She describes Raymond Blanc's restaurant Le Manoir aux Quat' Saisons as one of her favourites as well as the Old Queen's Head, local to where she lives in Penn, High Wycombe.

In February 2015 Berry featured in a programme in aid of the Third World charity Comic Relief. In May 2015 she began presenting a new BBC Two series called Mary Berry's Absolute Favourites. In November 2015 she was the subject a two-part biographical documentary entitled The Mary Berry Story.

Starting on 30 November 2015, she was one of the two judges for a four-week American edition of the popular baking competition The Great Holiday Baking Show on ABC, which followed a similar format to the British competition.

Berry became President of the National Garden Scheme in 2016 having opened her garden for charity for over 20 years.

In November 2016, it was announced that Berry would present a new six-part series, Mary Berry Everyday in which she would share her cooking tips, family favourites and special occasion recipes. The show aired on BBC Two.

In April 2017, Berry launched a series of cakes that could be bought from supermarkets. The cakes contain emulsifiers and preservatives that Berry has previously described as "unwanted extras".

From 22 November 2017 to 13 December 2017, Berry presented a 4-part series called Mary Berry's Country House Secrets on BBC One. In this series, she ventured to four of the UK's stately homes and explored each through the prism of food and history. The locations were Highclere Castle, Scone Palace, Powderham Castle and Goodwood House.

In 2018, Berry was a judge on Britain's Best Home Cook alongside chef Dan Doherty and Chris Bavin.

Berry's new six-part television cookery series called Mary Berry's Simple Comforts premiered on BBC2, 9 September 2020.

Mary Berry Saves Christmas, a BBC1 special in which Berry helps a group of amateur cooks make a Christmas feast for their families, was shown on Christmas Day 2020.

In 2021, Berry was a celebrity judge on the BBC series Celebrity Best Home Cook alongside Angela Hartnett and Chris Bavin; while Claudia Winkleman was the show's presenter.

In December 2021, Berry presented Mary Berry's Festive Feasts, a BBC TV special in which she teaches three novice cooks to create a Christmas feast.

In 2022, Berry was named as one of the judges for the Platinum Pudding, a competition to create a British pudding to celebrate the Platinum Jubilee of Queen Elizabeth II.

In March 2022, BBC One aired the three-part series Mary Berry's Fantastic Feasts.

In May 2022, Berry was a judge on the BBC One programme The Jubilee Pudding: 70 Years in the Baking, where she helped chose a brand new pudding to mark the Queen’s Platinum Jubilee.

In June 2022, the BBC commissioned the BBC Two series Mary Berry Cook And Share; which premiered on 7 September 2022.  

In September 2022, the BBC commissioned Mary Berry’s Ultimate Christmas, a Christmas special that Berry will present.

The Great British Bake Off

From 2010 to 2016 she was one of the judges on BBC One's (formerly, BBC Two's) The Great British Bake Off alongside baker Paul Hollywood, who specialises in bread. Berry says that since working together, she has learned from him. However, some viewers were outraged during the first series when a decision was made to make the contestants use one of Hollywood's recipes for scones instead of one of Berry's.

Her work on the show with Hollywood led to The Guardian'''s suggesting that it was the "best reality TV judging partnership ever." In September 2016, Love Productions announced that a three-year deal to broadcast the show on Channel 4 instead of the BBC from 2017 had been agreed. Co-hosts Mel Giedroyc and Sue Perkins announced that they would not be continuing with Bake Off on its new network. Berry announced she was also leaving Bake Off on the same day that fellow judge Paul Hollywood announced he would be staying with the show. She was replaced on the show by Prue Leith.

 The Platinum Pudding Competition 
In January 2022 it was announced that Berry would chair and sit as a judge on The Platinum Pudding Competition, a nationwide baking competition launched throughout the United Kingdom on 10 January 2022 by Buckingham Palace, Fortnum & Mason and The Big Jubilee Lunch to find a brand new pudding dedicated to Queen Elizabeth II as part of the official Platinum Jubilee celebrations in 2022 marking the 70th anniversary of the accession of Queen Elizabeth II on 6 February 1952.  

Personal life
Berry married Paul John March Hunnings in 1966. He worked for Harvey's of Bristol and sold antique books and is now retired. The couple have two sons and a daughter; one of the sons died in 1989, in a car accident aged 19. Berry is a patron of Child Bereavement UK.

In March 2013, Berry was placed second in a list of the fifty best-dressed over 50s by The Guardian. In September 2014, Berry was the subject of an episode of the BBC genealogy series Who Do You Think You Are? and discovered among her ancestors illegitimacy, bankruptcy and a baker.

Berry is a member of the Church of England and has worshipped at Holy Trinity Church in Penn since 1989. Her mother, who died in 2011, had also been an active church member. As part of the BBC2 programme Mary Berry's Easter Feast at Easter 2016, Berry visited Bishopthorpe Palace, the official residence of the Archbishop of York, who is the second most senior cleric in the Church of England, and filmed a special "Cooking with the Archbishop" segment.

Publications

Berry has written more than seventy cookery books since her first book was published in 1970, and has sold over five million cookery books. She regularly works on her cookery books with Lucy Young, who has been her assistant for over twenty years. Her best-selling Baking Bible was rated one of the ten best baking books by The Independent.

Since September 2014, Berry's recipes have also been packaged in an interactive mobile app called "Mary Berry: In Mary We Trust".

Her autobiography, Recipe for Life, was published in 2013 by Michael Joseph.

Honours and awards
In June 2009, Berry was awarded the Guild of Food Writers Lifetime Achievement Award.

Berry was appointed Commander of the Order of the British Empire (CBE) in the 2012 Birthday Honours for services to culinary arts.

In 2012, she was awarded an honorary degree by Bath Spa University which incorporates the former Bath College of Domestic Science.

On 7 June 2014, Berry was awarded the Freedom of the City of Bath; and, having already received the Freedom of the City of London, on 19 November 2014, she was made a liveryman of the Worshipful Company of Bakers.

She was awarded the Specsavers National Book Awards "Outstanding Achievement" prize in December 2014.

In April 2015 she was awarded FHM's 73rd place in its list of Sexiest Woman in the World. 

On 25 January 2017, Berry won the award for Best TV Judge at the National Television Awards for Great British Bake Off.''

Berry was appointed Dame Commander of the Order of the British Empire (DBE) in the 2020 Birthday Honours for services to broadcasting, the culinary arts and charity. She received the honour on 20 October 2021 at Windsor Castle.

References

External links
 
 
 

1935 births
Alumni of Le Cordon Bleu
Dames Commander of the Order of the British Empire
British autobiographers
British food writers
British television personalities
British women writers
Living people
People educated at Bath High School for Girls
People from Bath, Somerset
British Anglicans
Women food writers
Women cookbook writers
BBC television presenters
Television personalities from Somerset
Women autobiographers
English chefs